Shot Through the Heart is a 1998 television film directed by David Attwood, shown on the BBC and HBO in 1998, which covers the Siege of Sarajevo during the Bosnian War. The film is based on a true story and an article called Anti-Sniper by John Falk (published in the November 1995 issue of Details magazine). It won a Peabody Award in 1998.

Plot
The horrors of war are examined from the view points of lifelong friends and expert sharpshooters Vlado Selimović (Linus Roache) and Slavko Stanic (Vincent Perez), who end up on opposing sides of the Bosnian War in Sarajevo. Slavko, an ethnic Serb and unemployed bachelor, becomes a sniper and instructor training the Army of Republika Srpska snipers who used to terrorize the city. Vlado, a Muslim married father and successful owner of a furniture factory, rejects his friend's offer to gain an escape from the city. Instead, he becomes a marksman in the Army of the Republic of Bosnia and Herzegovina and attempts to counter the sniper threat. Vlado soon realizes his friend, an exceptionally skilled marksman, is the enemy sniper responsible for a number of seemingly impossible shots against residents of their own neighbourhood. The two friends eventually have to face-off and only one survives.

Cast
Linus Roache as Vlado Selimović
Vincent Perez as Slavko Stanić
Lia Williams as Maida Selimović
Adam Kotz as Miso
Soo Garay as Amela
Lothaire Bluteau as Zijah
Laura Petela as Lejla Kovacevic

Miscellaneous
The story was also the feature of an episode of Dateline NBC in 1998.

See also
 Pretty Village, Pretty Flame
 Savior

References

External links

1998 television films
1998 films
British television films
Canadian drama television films
Hungarian television films
Bosnian War films
English-language Canadian films
HBO Films films
Siege of Sarajevo
Peabody Award-winning broadcasts
Films about Bosnian genocide
Cultural depictions of Radovan Karadžić
Works about the Bosnian War
Films directed by David Attwood (film director)
1990s Canadian films